Punarjanma is a 1963 Indian Telugu-language drama film, produced by A. V. Subba Rao and directed by K. Pratyagatma. Based on the novel Patthar Ke Honth by Gulshan Nanda, it stars Akkineni Nageswara Rao and Krishna Kumari, with music composed by T. Chalapathi Rao. The film was remade in Hindi as Khilona (1970), in Tamil as Engirundho Vandhaal and in Malayalam as Amrithavaahini.

Plot 
Gopi is the son of Zamindar, and is a sculptor. He creates a statue, and becomes so attached to it that he calls it his "dream girl". But unfortunately, the statue catches fire and burns, when Gopi has a mental breakdown. Before the rift, Gopi is in love with his cousin Vasanthi (Vasanthi). However, Vasanthi's mother Yasoda Devi (Suryakantham) breaks up their relationship.  The doctor realised that music helps Gopi, so he advises him to have a beautiful girl who knows dance & music as his caretaker. Thus Zamindar, his father, brings a beautiful girl Radha (Krishna Kumari) from a Kothi to take care of Gopi. Though Radha is born in a family of courtesans, she does not follow this path, and longs to live a traditional family life. Radha does her best to serve Gopi and tries to make him sane. One day when Radha is playing with dolls, in a mock marriage Bommala Pelli with the children of the Zamindar's elder son (Prabhakar Reddy), Gopi suddenly ties his deceased mother's wedding chain Mangalsutra on Radha's neck. Zamindar and his mother (Hemalatha) accepts the new relationship as they understand the virtue of Radha. In the care of Radha, Gopi gradually regains his sanity. However, he forgets Radha and renews his love for Vasanthi. A crestfallen Radha leaves the house and resumes her life as an entertainer. Meanwhile, Gopi is confused as some vague remembrances haunt him when Vasanthi reveals the truth, and he immediately rushes for Radha. Finally, the movie ends on a happy note with the reunion of Gopi & Radha.

Cast 
Akkineni Nageswara Rao as Gopi
Krishna Kumari as Radha
Ramana Reddy as Professor
Gummadi as Zamindar
Padmanabham as Raja Rao
Prabhakar Reddy as Gopi's Brother
Raja Babu Basava Rao
Chadalavada as Radha's Uncle
Suryakantam as Yashoda Devì
Hemalatha as Gopi's Grandmother
L. Vijayalakshmi as Dancer
Sandhya as Janaki
Vasanthi as Vasanti
Nirmalamma as Radha's Mother

Soundtrack 
Music composed by T. Chalapathi Rao.

Reception 
T. M. Ramachandran, writing for Sport and Pastime, commended the cast performances, music and art direction.

References

External links 
 

1960s Telugu-language films
1963 drama films
1963 films
Films about courtesans in India
Films based on Indian novels
Films directed by Kotayya Pratyagatma
Films scored by T. Chalapathi Rao
Indian drama films
Films about mental health
Telugu films remade in other languages